Ferdinand N. Shurtleff (April 4, 1837 – April 6, 1903) was a Member of the Board of General Appraisers.

Education and career

Shurtleff was born April 4, 1837, in Hartland, New York. He entered private practice in Portland, Oregon. He served as commissary for the Grande Ronde Indian Reservation in Oregon from 1864 to 1869. He served as deputy collector of customs and customs collector in Portland from 1870 to 1880. He served as Superior Officer for the collector of customs in Portland from 1880 to 1890.

Federal judicial service

Shurtleff was nominated by President Benjamin Harrison on July 17, 1890, to the Board of General Appraisers, to a new seat created by 26 Stat. 131. He was confirmed by the United States Senate on July 18, 1890, and received his commission on July 22, 1890. His service terminated on May 12, 1899, due to his removal from office by President William McKinley. He was succeeded on the board by Israel F. Fischer.

Circumstances of his removal from office

In early 1899, Shurtleff received a request from the Treasury Department to resign from the Board, but declined to do so. It is believed partisan political pressure was behind the request. On May 3, 1899, President McKinley wrote Shurtleff, informing him that he was being removed from office, effective upon the appointment and qualification of his successor, which occurred on May 12, 1899. McKinley gave no cause for Shurtleff's removal and Shurtleff was not given the opportunity to defend himself before a commission. Shurtleff challenged his dismissal as unlawful in the Court of Claims which ruled against him, upon which he appealed to the United States Supreme Court. In the case Shurtleff vs. United States the Supreme Court ruled that barring a specific prohibition in the statute creating an office, the President of the United States may remove any officer without cause, thus denying Shurtleff's petition.

Death

Shurtleff died on April 6, 1903, in Portland, Oregon, ironically on the very day on which Shurtleff vs. United States was decided by the Supreme Court.

References

Sources
 

1837 births
1903 deaths
People from Hartland, New York
Members of the Board of General Appraisers
Lawyers from Portland, Oregon
Oregon lawyers
United States Article I federal judges appointed by Benjamin Harrison
19th-century American judges